Killer Bunnies is an album by trumpeter Jack Walrath which was recorded in 1986 and released on the British Spotlite label.

Track listing
All compositions by Jack Walrath except where noted
 "Snagadaa" – 8:08
 "A Study in Porcine" – 7:50
 "Kirsten Sunday Morning" – 4:58
 "Killer Bunnies" – 6:12
 "Duke Ellington's Sound of Love" (Charles Mingus) – 3:10
 "Four Freedom" (Paul Dunmall) – 2:42
 "Dustbiter" (Tim Richards) – 5:04

Personnel
Jack Walrath – trumpet 
Paul Dunmall – tenor saxophone
Tim Richards – piano
Paul Anstey – bass 
Tony Orrell – drums

References

Spotlite Records albums
Jack Walrath albums
1986 albums